The Oil and Gas Discovery Centre (OGDC) is a science centre in Seria, Belait District, Brunei. It was constructed near the Seria Oil Field and was rebranded Seria Energy Lab (SEL) in 2020.

History
The centre was officiated by Sultan Hassanal Bolkiah on 14 September 2002.

From 2 July 2018 until 2 May 2020, it underwent major renovation and the rebranding of its name from Oil and Gas Discovery Centre to Seria Energy Lab.

Architecture
The centre consists of the main gallery, basketball court, beach soccer pit, big top, classroom, conference room, playground, science lab and theater.

Gallery

See also
 Tourism in Brunei

References

External links
 

2002 establishments in Brunei
Buildings and structures in Brunei
Science and technology in Brunei
Scientific organisations based in Brunei